Chile at the 1964 Summer Olympics in Tokyo, Japan] was the nation's twelfth appearance out of fifteen editions of the Summer Olympic Games. The nation was represented by an all-male team of 14 athletes that competed in 13 events in 6 sports.

Athletics

Boxing

Equestrian

Fencing

Three fencers, all men, represented Chile in 1964.

Men's épée
 Sergio Vergara
 Sergio Jimenez
 Aquilles Gloffka

Modern pentathlon

One male pentathlete represented Chile in 1964.

Individual
 Aquilles Gloffka

Shooting

Three shooters represented Chile in 1964.

50 m rifle, prone
 Roberto Huber

Trap
 Juan Enrique Lira
 Gilberto Navarro

References

External links
Official Olympic Reports

Nations at the 1964 Summer Olympics
1964
1964 in Chilean sport